The National Development Policy was a Malaysian economic policy introduced by Prime Minister Mahathir Mohamad. The objective was achieving economic growth, while ensuring that accrued benefits reached all sections of society. The National Development Policy replaced the New Economic Policy (NEP) in 1990 but continued to pursue most NEP policies of affirmative action for bumiputera. The Malay share of the economy, though substantially larger, was not near the 30% target according to government figures. In its review of the NEP, the government found that although income inequality had been reduced, some important targets related to overall Malay corporate ownership had not been met. This policy was adopted in 1991 for a period of 10 years and it was succeeded by the National Vision Policy (NVP) in 2001.

References

Affirmative action in Asia
Economy of Malaysia
Racial and religious quotas in Malaysia
Public policy in Malaysia
1990 establishments in Malaysia
Welfare in Malaysia